Hassan Ramazani (born 8 August 2001), is an Australian professional soccer player who plays as a full back for Lions FC.

References

External links

2001 births
Living people
Australian soccer players
Association football defenders
Brisbane Roar FC players
National Premier Leagues players
A-League Men players
Brisbane Strikers FC players